The Battle of Saorgio focuses on the town of Saorge, and may refer to:

 First Battle of Saorgio (1793)
 Second Battle of Saorgio (1794)